Krsta Kovačević (1877—January 30, 1948), known as Krsta Trgoviški (Крста Трговишки), was a Serbian Chetnik commander that was active in Old Serbia and Macedonia during the Macedonian Struggle (1903–08), then participated in the Balkan Wars (1912–13) and World War I (1914–18). In Bulgaria he is considered a Bulgarian renegade who switched sides, i.e. (sic) Serboman.

Early life
Kovačević was born in the village of Trgovište in the Pčinja region, which at the time was administratively part of the Preševo kaza (administrative region) of the Kosovo Vilayet in the Ottoman Empire (now located in Serbia). He was a blacksmith in his birth village until 1900, when he murdered an Ottoman soldier who beat up his younger brother Spiro. He fled to the Principality of Bulgaria where he worked as a labourer on the railways in Sofia.

IMRO
Kovačević was soon noticed by the pro-Bulgarian Internal Macedonian Revolutionary Organization (IMRO), which recruited him into the organization. He was initially part of the četa (band) of general Ivan Tsonchev, where he became best friends with Krastyo Lazarov, the later IMRO commander of Kumanovo. At the time of the Ilinden Uprising (1903) he was part of the band of IMRO commander of Skopje, Nikola Pushkarov, at which time he used his experience as a railway worker to blow up the rail near the village of Novačani. After Pushkarov's withdrawal, Kovačević joined the band of Todor Panitsa whose band after several unsuccessful skirmishes was forced to take shelter in Vranje, in the Kingdom of Serbia. There, Kovačević befriended Živojin Rafajlović, and determined to join the newly self-organized Serbian Chetnik Organization, thus he left the Bulgarian organization which had up until then had many Serbian fighters in its ranks (as there was no self-organized Serbian organization prior to 1904).

Serbian Organization
In 1904, Kovačević was awarded the title of vojvoda, and he commanded several notable fighters who later became commanders themselves, such as Vojislav Tankosić and Vojin Popović-Vuk. After the Young Turk Revolution (1908), he lived a peaceful life in Preševo until 1909, when he discovered just in time that the Turks sought to murder him, which made him leave for the woods.

First Balkan War
In the First Balkan War he participated as a vojvoda in the Chetnik detachment of vojvoda Vojin Popović-Vuk, his old friend. He participated in the battles of Kumanovo, Mukos and Bakarna Gumna.

World War I
Kovačević participated in World War I as well, alongside six of his brothers and cousins. He independently led his band through Albania in 1915–16, and participated in the breakthrough of the Salonika front.

Later years
In 1924 he led a band that pursued the band of Vancho Mihailov and bands of Albanian kachaks. During the German occupation of Serbia (1941–44) he lived secretly in Leskovac. He died in 1948, in Preševo.

Sources

1877 births
1948 deaths
People from Trgovište
People from Kosovo vilayet
Serbian rebels
Serbian military personnel of the Balkan Wars
Serbian military personnel of World War I
20th-century Serbian people
Royal Serbian Army soldiers